The Diocese of Glasgow and Galloway is one of the seven dioceses of the Scottish Episcopal Church. It covers Dumfries and Galloway, Ayrshire, Lanarkshire (including Glasgow), Dunbartonshire, Renfrewshire and west Stirlingshire (south of the River Forth). The cathedral of the diocese is St. Mary's Cathedral, Glasgow.

History 

The Diocese of Glasgow and Galloway is a union of two of the oldest dioceses in Scotland. The Diocese of Galloway (also known as Candida Casa or Whithorn) is thought to have been founded by Saint Ninian in the 5th century. The Diocese of Glasgow is thought to have been founded by Saint Mungo (or Kentigern) around 550. On 9 January 1492, the Diocese of Glasgow was raised in rank to be an archdiocese.

During the Scottish Reformation, the heritage and jurisdiction of the church passed into the hands of Church of Scotland. However, the small Scottish Episcopal Church continued the line of bishops of both diocese, even though, in the 16th century, many of them held the office in title alone. In 1697, the Diocese of Galloway was united with the Diocese of Edinburgh. In 1708, the episcopal line experienced a hiatus before continuing with Alexander Duncan, in 1731, as Bishop (rather than Archbishop) of Glasgow. However, when Duncan died two years after his appointment as bishop, the see fell vacant once more. In 1787, William Abernethy Drummond became Bishop of Edinburgh and Galloway and Bishop of Brechin in a temporary personal union of the dioceses. To this he added the then vacant see of Glasgow in union with Edinburgh and Galloway. Within a year, Drummond gave way to John Strachan as the newly appointed Bishop of Brechin, and, in 1805, resigned from the united see of Edinburgh and Galloway (to Daniel Sandford) to focus on ministry in Glasgow. Drummond continued as Bishop of Glasgow until his death in 1809, when the see was reunited with Edinburgh and Galloway.

In 1837, James Walker, bishop of the triple see and Primus, gave way to Michael Russell to be the first modern Bishop of Glasgow and Galloway. In 1878, the Roman Catholic Church formed a new Archdiocese of Glasgow and Diocese of Galloway in its modern structures. In 1888, the counties of Selkirkshire, Peeblesshire and Roxburghshire, which were historically part of the Diocese of Galloway, were transferred from the Episcopalian Diocese of Glasgow and Galloway back to Edinburgh.

Gregor Duncan was elected the fourteenth bishop of the diocese on 16 January 2010. He was consecrated and enthroned as bishop on 23 April 2010, and retired on 11 October 2018. 

Kevin Pearson was elected the fifteenth bishop of the diocese on 18 January 2020. He was installed by deed on 1 July 2020.

Companion Dioceses 
The Diocese of Glasgow and Galloway formerly had companion links with the Episcopal Diocese of Byumba (Rwanda), the Episcopal Diocese of Kentucky (ECUSA) and the Lutheran Diocese of Gothenburg, Sweden.

Area and population 
The diocese covers the historic counties of Dunbartonshire, Renfrewshire, Lanarkshire, Ayrshire, Wigtownshire, Kirkcudbrightshire, Dumfriesshire and western Stirlingshire.

This total population of approximately 2,334,000 gives the diocese a ratio of one priest to every 60,000 inhabitants and one church to every 38,900 inhabitants.

List of churches 
The diocese currently has 35 stipendiary clergy and 55 active churches.

Former congregation

Defunct churches

See also
Presbytery of Glasgow (Church of Scotland)
Roman Catholic Archdiocese of Glasgow

References 

Glasgow
Christianity in Glasgow
Christianity in Dumfries and Galloway
Christianity in Renfrewshire
Christianity in South Ayrshire
Christianity in North Lanarkshire